Helmut Lang (born 10 March 1956) is an Austrian artist and former fashion designer and mentor who lives and works in New York and on Long Island.

Career
In 1986, Lang showed his first Helmut Lang runway collection in Paris at Centre Georges Pompidou. His first Helmut men's collection debuted in 1987 and a decade later he moved his label from Vienna to New York.

Lang used unconventional materials such as rubber, feathers and metallic fabrics and redefined the silhouette of the 1990s and early 2000s. He broke away from the runway show-as-spectacle in the height of the 1980s opulence and was the first to stream his collection online in 1998.

Lang's brand was known for its utilitarian, minimalist aesthetic, as well as for his prestige range of denim.

In 1999, Lang sold a 51% stake in his company to the Prada Group, with Prada running distribution and manufacturing and Lang controlling design and advertising. Afterwards, Prada developed a line of Helmut Lang accessories such as shoes, belts and bags, and opened Helmut Lang stores in Hong Kong and Singapore. Sales under the Prada Group fell from $100 million in 1999  to $37 million in 2003. The brand's decision to cancel the licensing for an external company to manufacture and market its profitable range of Helmut Lang Jeans was cited as one of the reasons for its loss in revenue. In 2005 he left his label and retired from fashion. He has since been based in New York City and on Long Island as a practicing artist. In 2006, Prada sold the Helmut Lang brand to Link Theory Holdings.

Lang has collaborated with artists Jenny Holzer and Louise Bourgeois. His recent works explore abstract sculptural forms and physical arrangements beyond the limitations of the human body. Lang had his first solo art exhibition ALLES GLEICH SCHWER at the Kestnergesellschaft in Hannover in 2008 and has since presented solo exhibitions internationally. Lang has published excerpts from his ongoing art projects Long Island Diaries  and The Selective Memory Series  in a number of publications, such as BUTT Magazine , Fannzine 137 , Visionaire and most recently The Travel Almanac .

Work

This timeline outlines Helmut Lang's work in fashion and art up until 2021.

Solo Exhibitions

Group Exhibitions

Helmut Lang fashion 1977–2005
This timeline outlines the developments in Lang's fashion as well significant attributes of key collections.

Collections
Helmut Lang's works are part of the following collections:

Costume Institute at The Metropolitan Museum of Art, New York
Deste Foundation for Contemporary Art, Athens
Fashion Museum, Bath, United Kingdom
Groninger Museum, Groninger, The Netherlands
LACMA, Los Angeles
MAK, Museum of Applied Arts / Contemporary Art, Vienna, Austria 
Museum of Fine Arts, Boston
MOMU, Antwerp, Belgium 
Musée de la Mode et du Textile, Paris
Musée Galliera, Paris
Museo de la Moda, Santiago, Chile 
Phoenix Art Museum, Phoenix, USA
SONS, Kruishoutem, Belgium 
The Arts Center, Melbourne, Australia 
The Museum at The Fashion Institute of Technology, New York
The National Museum of Art, Architecture and Design, Oslo, Norway

Architecture projects

Original Helmut Lang stores (until 2005)

All of the original Helmut Lang stores have been closed. The last one to close was the Paris location in late 2005. Most of the art-inspired stores had been designed by Lang in collaboration with Gluckman Mayner Architects of New York.

1995
Helmut Lang Munich, Kardinal-Faulhaber-Straße, 3, 80333, Munich, Germany.
Helmut Lang Milan, Via St. Andrea, 14, 20212, Milan, Italy.

1997
Helmut Lang Vienna, Seilergasse, 6, 1010, Vienna, Austria.
Helmut Lang New York, Worldwide Flagship Store, 80 Greene Street, New York, NY 10012.
Helmut Lang Headquarters, 80 Greene Street, New York, NY 10012, USA.

2000
Helmut Lang Paris, Store-within-a-store, Printemps, 64 Bld. Haussman, 75451, Paris, France.
Helmut Lang Hong Kong, Store-within-a-store, 228-230 Landmark Central, Hong Kong.
Helmut Lang Singapore, Store-within-a-store, 9 Scott Road #02-10/11/12/13, Pacific Plaza, 228210, Singapore.
Helmut Lang Aichi, Store-within-a-store, Nagoya Mitsukoshi, Mitsukoshi Nagoya Sakae 2F, 3-5-1 Sakae, Naka-ku Nagoya, Aichi, Japan.
Helmut Lang Tokyo, Store-within-a-store, Isetan Shinjuku Men, Isetan Shinjuku Men's-Kan 3F, 3-14-1 Shinjuku, Shinjuku, Tokyo.
Helmut Lang Tokyo, Store-within-a-store, Isetan Shinjuku Women, Isetan Shinjuku Annex Building 4F, 3-14-1 Shinjuku, Shinjuku, Tokyo.
Helmut Lang Tokyo, Store-within-a-store, Shibuya Seibu Men, Seibu Shibuya Annex B 1F/4F, 21-1 Udagawa-cho, Shibuya, Tokyo.
Helmut Lang Tokyo, Store-within-a-store, Shibuya Seibu Women, Seibu Shibuya Annex B 1F/4F, 21-1 Udagawa-cho, Shibuya.
Helmut Lang Seoul, Store-within-a-store, 2F, Shinsegae Department Store Kangnam Branch, 19-3 Banpo-dong, Seocho-ku, Seoul.
Helmut Lang Kobe, Dainichi-Akashicho Building 18, Akashi-cho, Chuo-ku, Kobe-shi, Hyogo, Japan.
Helmut Lang Parfums New York, 81 Greene Street, New York, NY 10012.

2002
Helmut Lang Studio, 142 Greene Street, New York, NY 10012.
Helmut Lang Made-to-Measure New York, 142 Greene Street, New York, NY 10012.

2003
Helmut Lang Paris, 219 Rue Saint-Honore, 75001, Paris.
Helmut Lang Milan (new location), Via della Spiga, 11, Milan, 20121.

Fragrance Projects

Four different scents were created by Lang in cooperation with Procter & Gamble, all of which were discontinued with the 2005 closing of the brand.

Helmut Lang (Women's) - 2000
Helmut Lang Pour Homme (Men's) - 2001
Helmut Lang Velviona (women's and men's) - limited release available exclusively at New York store - 2001
Helmut Lang Cuiron (men's) - 2002

Awards 
CFDA, Best International Designer of the Year, 1996.
VH-1/Vogue Award, Best Menswear Designer of the Year, 1997.
Fine Arts of Vienna, 1997.
Pitti Immagine Award, Best Designer of the Nineties, 1998.
New York Magazine Best Designer of the Year Award, 1998.
I.D. Magazine, Design Distinction Award for Environments, 1998.
NYC Chapter of the American Institute of Architects: Award for Interiors, 1998.
Business Week/Architectural Record Award, 1999.
The American Institute of Architects, Award for Interior Architecture, 1999.
CFDA Menswear Designer of the Year, 2000.
GQ Designer of the Year, 2004.
Fashion Group International,“The Imagineers of Our Time" Award, 2004.
LEAD Award, 2005.
Austrian Decoration for Science and Art, 2009

Bibliography
Key interviews

Armstrong, Annie. “'There is No Plan B’: Helmut Lang on Turning His Fashion Archive into Sculpture." artnews.com (ARTnews). 19 September 2019.
Belcove, Julie L. “From Fashion to Art: Helmut Lang’s Second Act." wsj.com (WSJ.). 6 January 2015.
Borrelli-Persson, Laird. “'No Regrets.' Helmut Lang Speaks About His 'Living Archive' Intervention at the MAK in Vienna and His Work in Fashion." vogue.com (Vogue). 26 February 2020.
Bourgeois, Louise, "Louise Bourgeois on...Helmut Lang," Wallpaper. October 2008.
Frankel, Susannah, "Helmut Lang," AnOther Magazine. September 2010. 
Gavin, Francesca. “A Rare Interview with Helmut Lang." anothermag.com (AnOther Magazine). 20 September 2019.
McGrath, Charles. “A Seamless Transition From Fashion to Art." The New York Times. 1 May 2012.
Obrist, Hans-Ulrich, "Helmut Lang," The Observer, November 2008. 
Petronio, Ezra, "Front Row." Self Service. June 2010. 
Porter, Charlie. "Helmut Lang." i-D. August 2008. 
Solway, Diane. "Helmut Lang." W. October 2008. 
Thompson, Allese. “500 Words: Helmut Lang." artforum.com (Artforum). 16 January 2015.
Wakefield, Neville. "Conversation Between Helmut Lang and Neville Wakefield." absolut.com/helmutlang. September 2008. 
Wakefield, Neville. “Helmut Lang”. The Journal. January 2007.

References

External links 

 Helmut Lang Studio web site
 hl-art web site 
 

People from Donaustadt
1956 births
Living people
Austrian artists
Austrian fashion designers
Recipients of the Austrian Decoration for Science and Art
Menswear designers